John William Spearink Moore (29 April 1891 – 23 June 1980) was an English cricketer. Moore was a right-handed batsman who bowled right-arm medium pace.

Moore made his first-class debut for Hampshire in the 1910 County Championship against Sussex. Moore played infrequently for Hampshire between 1910 and 1913, making just fifteen first-class appearance for the club. Moore's final first-class appearance came during the 1913 season against Warwickshire. Moore had little success with the bat for Hampshire, scoring 256 runs at an average of 13.47, with a high score of 30.

Outside of the first-class arena, Moore played club cricket for Basingstoke and North Hants and Hartley Wintney.

Moore died at Basingstoke, Hampshire on 23 June 1980.

External links
John Moore at Cricinfo
John Moore at CricketArchive
Matches and detailed statistics for John Moore

1891 births
1980 deaths
People from Hart District
English cricketers
Hampshire cricketers